Tisanart Sornsuek (also known as Now or Nao, born 5 May 1993) is a Thai television actress and model. She is best known for her leading role acting in the movie Love Julinsee and television drama Kom Payabaht (2014), Kularb Len Fai (2014). She has acted in many Thai television series.

Early life and education 
Tisanart was born on May 5, 1993 in  Bangkok, Thailand.

Career
Tisanart made her acting debut with Jirayu La-ongmanee in a teenage film “Love Julinsee” before signing with Channel 7 in 2011. The film released on 3 March 2011. In the same year, she took on her first television series in the Thai drama Num, where she played the supporting role. And then, she starred her role as Dawan in the drama  airing on Channel 7 in 2011.

She would later become known for leading roles in Kom Payabaht and Kularb Len Fai in 2014. She also main starred in the 2016 drama series Atitha and Sarb Dok Soi, produced and aired by Channel 7. She gained MAYA Awards in 2015.

In 2017, she starred a leading role in the drama La Ong Dao (ละอองดาว) alongside Akkaphan Namart. In the same year, she starred in her second film Memoir, a Thai horror movie where she played the leading role with Jittaleela Suppanad.

She is one of popular television stars in Thailand.

Filmography

Film

Television series

References

External links

Tisanart Sornsuek on Asian Fuse
Tisanart Sornsuek News on Bugsboo TV

1994 births
Living people
Tisanart Sornsuek
Tisanart Sornsuek